Rezaabad (also Romanized as Rez̤āābād) is a village in Rudbar Rural District, in the Central District of Rudbar-e Jonubi County, Kerman Province, Iran. At the 2006 census, its population was 372, in 71 families.

References 

Populated places in Rudbar-e Jonubi County